Ghada Karmi (born 1939) is a Palestinian-born academic, physician and author. She has written on Palestinian issues in newspapers and magazines, including The Guardian, The Nation and Journal of Palestine Studies.

Early life and education

Karmi was born in Jerusalem to a Muslim family. Her father, Hasan Sa'id Karmi was Palestinian while her mother was Syrian; she was the youngest child with an older brother and sister. In her 2002 autobiography, In Search of Fatima: A Palestinian Story, she describes growing up in the Jerusalem neighbourhood of Katamon, with its mixture of Palestinian Christians and Muslims. Among the family friends and neighbors was poet Khalil al-Sakakini and his family. Her family fled Jerusalem for Damascus in April 1948; their villa was taken by Israel. The family eventually settled in Golders Green, in London, where her father worked for the BBC Arabic Service as a translator and broadcaster.

Karmi studied medicine at the University of Bristol, graduating in 1964. Initially, she practised as a physician, specialising in the health and social conditions of ethnic minorities, migrants and asylum seekers.

Academic career, activism and writings
Karmi was formerly married to someone she described in 2002 as a "quintessentially English boy" from a farming family near Bath. The Six-Day War (Arab–Israeli war of 1967) led to the end of her marriage as her husband and their friends were all on the side of Israel. She became a supporter of the Palestine Liberation Organization and gained a "burning sense of injustice" around the events of her childhood, as she told Donald Macintyre of The Independent in 2005. Since 1972, she has been politically active for the Palestinian cause and gained a doctorate in the history of Arabic medicine from the University of London.

Karmi is an associate fellow at the Royal Institute of International Affairs in London, and a visiting professor at London Metropolitan University. She is also vice-chair of the Council for Arab-British Understanding (CAABU).

She delivered the Edward Said Memorial lecture at the University of Adelaide, Australia in 2007.

In her memoir, Return, Karmi describes a visit to her former home in Jerusalem following an invitation from Steven Erlanger, then the Jerusalem bureau chief of The New York Times, who realised his apartment was built onto the Karmi family's house described in her book In Search of Fatima. The experience was painful for her and she wrote in Return: "All I could think of were the many alien people who had lived in these rooms after us, and how each one erased more and more of our presence there."

Israel and Palestine
In an interview with Executive Intelligence Review (reprinted in Middle East Policy Journal), Karmi stated that:"There is actually nothing — repeat, nothing — positive about the existence of Israel, as far as the Arabs are concerned. You know, sometimes there are events, historical events, that happen against people's will. But, in time, they can find some positive aspect to something they didn't want to happen in the first place. This is not the case with Israel. On the contrary, as time has gone on, the existence of Israel has only increased the problems for the Arab region. It has increased the danger in the Arab world and is a threat not only to the security of the region, but the security of the whole world." She also stated that:"Israel, from its inception in 1948, has been given the most wonderful opportunity to behave itself, and it clearly has not done so. It's flouted every single law, it's behaved outrageously, it's made a travesty of international and humanitarian law. On what basis should this state continue to be a member of the United Nations?"

At the Palestinian Return Conference held at SOAS in January 2011, Karmi referred to the creation of Israel as involving the dispossession and theft of a whole country: "The only way to reverse that is on the basis of rights and justice; that is the right of return of the refugees and the dispossessed and the exiles back to their homeland." She was then quoted as stating:"If that were to happen we know very well that that would be the end of a Jewish state in our region".

At a protest as part of the Global March to Jerusalem held in front of the Israeli Embassy in London on March 30, 2012, Karmi stated "Israel is finished". She further stated: "Today, we are here together because we know, we understand what Israel is doing to Jerusalem" and that Jerusalem "does not belong to Jewish Israelis or to Jews. We respect all religions but we do not allow one group to take over this wonderful city." According to Karmi, Israel does not deserve to continue as a state and that "We have no alternative but to act. The only way we can stop Israel is to act against it, against its interests, against its apartheid and policies."

In 2012, Karmi was criticized by Shai Afsai as an example of authors who treat the Zionist story "The bride is beautiful, but she is married to another man" as historical fact, which Karmi was said to have done in her book Married to Another Man and in other writings, although the story lacks a primary source. Other examples of authors given included Avi Shlaim and Anthony Pagden.

In 2017, The Jewish Chronicle reported Karmi had said the word "untermensch", originally used as a description of Jews by the Nazis, could be legitimately used as a description of the relationship of Israel to the Palestinians at a conference held in Cork in the Republic of Ireland. Referring to an objection made against the use of the word, she said "about the use of the word 'untermesch'. Untermensch's equivalent in English is sub-human. And sub-human is how people in Gaza feel they are being treated by the Israeli army." According to her, the Jewish population in Palestine were "groups of foreign immigrants trying to behave as though they were indigenous" and "It is a foreign community who just turned up." The creation of Israel was a "a stitch up from beginning to end" by the United Nations.

Selected bibliography

Books
Al-Hassan, Ahmad Y.; Ghada Karmi & Nizar Namnum (eds.) Proceedings of the First International Symposium for the History of Arabic Science 5–12 April 1976. Volume II. Papers in European Languages. Aleppo: University of Aleppo, Institute for the History of Arabic Science, 1978.
Karmi, Ghada: Multicultural Health Care: Current Practice and Future Policy in Medical Education  British Medical Association, London, 1995,
Karmi, Ghada (Ed.) with a contribution by Edward Said: Jerusalem Today: What Future for the Peace Process?  Ithaca Press, 1996
Review of Jerusalem Today: What Future for the Peace Process?, by Andrej Kreutz, in Arab Studies Quarterly (ASQ), Fall, 1999.
Karmi, Ghada: The Palestinian Exodus 1948-1998. Ithaca Press 1999
Karmi, Ghada: In Search of Fatima: A Palestinian Story  Verso 2002
A country of the mind Guardian, Saturday 19 October 2002 (from Dr Ghada Karmi's memoir, In Search of Fatima)
In Search of Fatima Fateful Days in 1948 from Jerusalem Quarterly (from Dr Ghada Karmi's memoir, In Search of Fatima)
Review of In Search of Fatima, the Guardian
Review of In Search of Fatima by Sara Powell Washington Report on Middle East Affairs, December 2004, page 68
Karmi, Ghada: Married to another man: Israel's dilemma in Palestine, Pluto Press, 2007, 
Review, by Sonja Karkar, IMEU, 10 October 2007
The Times Literary Supplement Review by Trevor Mostyn 15 February 2008 p. 5

Articles
"Why Arabs support Saddam" in Middle East International No 384, 28 September 1990, p.20
"The 1948 Exodus: A Family Story" in Journal of Palestine Studies 23, no. 2 (Win. 1994): 31-40.
U.S. Embassy Move to Jerusalem Is Misguided and Illegal January/February 1997, p. 14 Washington Report on Middle East Affairs
 The Tablet, 11 April 1998
 in The Tablet, 25 April 1998
”Palestinians in Lebanon” in Middle East International No 591, 15 January 1998 (sic) 1999; pp.21-23
"After the Nakba: An Experience of Exile in England" in Journal of Palestine Studies 28, no. 3 (Spr. 1999): 52-63.
Kosovars and Palestinians, The Nation, 20 May 1999 7 June 1999 issue)
 in Al-Ahram Weekly, 2–8 September 1999
 in Al-Ahram Weekly, 6–12 April 2000
The future of peace: A Palestinian view 31 October 2000, BBC
 in Al-Ahram Weekly, 22 February 2001
 Al-Adab (Lebanon), July 2002
The map must show a way home, The Guardian, 6 June 2003
Edward Said and the politics of dispossession 9–15 October 2003 Issue No. 659 Al-Ahram Weekly
A very Arab obsession 20–26 November 2003, Issue No. 665, Al-Ahram Weekly
Time to remember 22–28 January 2004, Issue No. 674, Al-Ahram
Zionism is Still the Issue, Dissident Voice, 2 February 2004
Sharon is not the Problem: It's the Nature of Zionist Ideology 20 February 2004, CounterPunch
By any means necessary, The Guardian, 18 March 2004
Vanishing the Palestinians; The World Looks on Ineffectually 17/ 18 July 2004, CounterPunch
After Arafat: Sharon is Still Not Ready to Make Peace 10 November 2004, CounterPunch
Who killed Yasser Arafat? 11–17 November 2004 Issue No. 716, Al-Ahram Weekly
Gaza hysteria 25 August 2005, issue 757, Al-Ahram Weekly
With no Palestinian state in sight, aid becomes an adjunct to occupation, The Guardian, 5 January 2006
Where is the global outcry at this continuing cruelty?, The Guardian, 15 May 2006
These shameful events have humiliated the Arab world, The Guardian, 2 January 2007
Derek Summerfield, Colin Green, Ghada Karmi, David Halpin, Pauline Cutting, 125 other doctors: Israeli boycotts: gesture politics or a moral imperative?, 21 April 2007, The Guardian
Ghada Karmi (pro-boycott) Andy Charlwood (against the boycott): Perspectives on the boycott debate, 11 June 2007, The Guardian
Weapon of the weak, 13 July 2007, Haaretz
A historic anomaly, 17 July 2007, The Guardian
Israel’s cost to the Arabs, September 2008, Le Monde diplomatique
Intellectual terrorism, 25 October 2007, The Guardian
Taking sides in the debate over the Middle East, 29 October 2007, The Guardian
Colin Green, Asad Khan, Ghada Karmi, Chris Burns-Cox, Martin Birnstingl, David Halpin, Derek Summerfield: Medical ethical violations in Gaza , 6 December 2007, The Lancet
A one-state solution for Palestinians and Israelis, 30 May 2008, The Christian Science Monitor

References

External links

 15 May 2008, Interview on Democracy Now!

1939 births
Living people
Academics of London Metropolitan University
Academics of the University of Exeter
Alumni of the University of Bristol
Palestinian Muslims
People from Jerusalem
Historians of the Middle East
Palestinian non-fiction writers
Palestinian political journalists
Palestinian women writers
Palestinian women academics
Palestinian women physicians
PEN Oakland/Josephine Miles Literary Award winners
People from Tulkarm
20th-century Palestinian women writers
20th-century Palestinian writers
21st-century Palestinian women writers
21st-century Palestinian writers
20th-century Palestinian physicians